The list of University of Lagos people includes notable graduates, professors, and administrators affiliated with the University of Lagos.

Notable alumni, faculty and staff

Vice-Chancellors
Professor Folasade Ogunsola: 2022–present
Professor Oluwatoyin Ogundipe: 2017–2022
Professor Rahmon Ade Bello: 2012–2017
Professor Babatunde Adetokunbo Sofoluwe: 2010–2012
Professor Tolu Olukayode Odugbemi: 2007–2010
Professor Oyewusi Ibidapo Obe: Ag, 2000–2002; 2002–2007
Professor Jelili Adebisi Omotola: 1995–2000
Professor Nurudeen Oladapo Alao: 1988–1995
Professor Akinpelu Oludele Adesola: 1981–1988
Professor Babatunde Kwaku Adadevoh: 1978–1980
Professor Jacob F. Adeniyi Ajayi: 1972–1978
Professor Saburi Biobaku: 1965–1971
Professor Eni Njoku: 1962–1965

Notable faculty 
 Ayodele Awojobi
 Laurence Gower
 David Aradeon
 Akin Euba
 Cornelius Taiwo
 Chike Obi
 Taslim Olawale Elias

Notable alumni

Fabian Ajogwu, lawyer
Francis Agu, actor
Funke Akindele, actress
Omowunmi Akinnifesi, public relations consultant, former MBGN
IllRymz, musician and television personality
Bisi Alimi, gay rights activist
Lola Akande, author and academic
Daré Art-Aladé, singer
Reekado Banks, singer
Wunmi Obe, singer
Adewale Ayuba, singer
Regina Askia-Williams, nurse practitioner, actress, and former Miss Unilag
Philip Begho, writer
Funsho Williams, civil servant
Stella Damasus, actress
Denrele, television presenter.
Eniola Akinkuotu, journalist 

Sasha P, rapper, musician, businesswoman, lawyer and motivational speaker
Akin Babalola Kamar Odunsi, politician
Ufuoma McDermott, model and actress
Fidelis Oditah, lawyer
Grace Ekpiwhre, former minister
eLDee, rapper
Linda Ikeji, former model and blogger
Oby Ezekwesili, accountant
Kayode Fayemi, former Ekiti governor
Kate Henshaw, actress
Matilda Kerry, doctor, former MBGN
Oliver Mbamara, lawyer
Richard Mofe-Damijo, actor
Tony Momoh, lawyer
Genevieve Nnaji, actress
Teju Babyface, comedian
Mary Akpobome, banker
Ramsey Nouah, actor
Chinenye Ochuba, former MBGN
Bayo Ojo, lawyer
Ikedi Ohakim, former Imo governor
Afolabi Olabimtan, writer
Dele Olojede, journalist
Simbo Olorunfemi, writer and television producer
Mike Omoighe, artist
Helen Ovbiagele, writer
Joke Silva, actress
Adetokunbo Kayode, former minister
Ganiyu Solomon, politician
Farida Mzamber Waziri, EFCC chairman
Kunlé Adeyemi, architect
Tony Elumelu, economist
Helen Paul, comedian
Chude Jideonwo, journalist
Koffi Idowu Nuel, comedian
Akinwunmi Ambode, former Accountant-General of Lagos State and former Governor of Lagos State
Jimi Agbaje, Lagos State governorship candidate for 2015 elections
Yakubu Itua, former member federal house of representative 1983 and former judge High Court of Justice, Benin-City
Sarah Jibril, Nigeria's first female presidential aspirant.
Omoyemi Akerele, fashion designer and founder of Style House Files
Sophie Oluwole, philosopher
Abayomi Owope: TV presenter
Timini Egbuson , actor
Dakore Akande, actress
Ifeanyi Chudy Momah Politician, Lawyer and Member Federal House of Representatives. 
Victoria Inyama, Nigerian actress. 
Moyo Lawal, Nigerian actress 
Jibola Dabo, Nigerian actor 
Bobrisky, Nigerian transgender entrepreneur 
Shade Omoniyi, Nigeria actress
Tim Owhefere, Nigerian politician
Laycon, rapper
Emilia Asim-Ita, entrepreneur 
Tobi Bakre, actor and presenter 
Broda Shaggi, comedian

References

University of Lagos people